Piet van de Kamp (December 26, 1901 in Kampen  – May 18, 1995 in Amsterdam), known as Peter van de Kamp in the United States, was a Dutch astronomer who lived in the United States most of his life. He was professor of astronomy at Swarthmore College and director of the college's Sproul Observatory from 1937 until 1972. He specialized in astrometry, studying parallax and proper motions of stars.  He came to public attention in the 1960s when he announced that Barnard's star had a planetary system based on observed "wobbles" in its motion, but this is now known to be false.
On November 14, 2018, the Red Dots project announced that Barnard's star hosts an exoplanet at least 3.2 times as massive as Earth, though this does not match either of the planets he had claimed. In 2021, even this planet's existence was questioned.

Life
Van de Kamp was the son of Lubbertus van de Kamp, who had an administrative job at a cigar factory, and Engelina C.A. van der Wal. His younger brother Jacob van de Kamp was also a successful scientist: an organic chemist, who spent most of his career in the United States. Van de Kamp studied at the University of Utrecht and started his professional career at the Kapteyn Astronomical Institute in Groningen working with Pieter Johannes van Rhijn. In 1923 he left for the Leander McCormick Observatory at the University of Virginia for a year's residence supported by the Draper Fund of the National Academy of Sciences. There he assisted Samuel Alfred Mitchell with his extensive stellar parallax program and Harold Alden with the lengthy Boss star project.

The following year Van de Kamp went to the Lick Observatory in California as a Kellogg fellow. There he received his PhD from the University of California in Astronomy in June 1925. The next year he also received a PhD from the University of Groningen. Van de Kamp returned to McCormick on October 1, 1925, to take up the position left vacant by Harold Alden, who had just taken up the directorship of the Yale University Observatory Southern Station in Johannesburg, South Africa. In the spring of 1937, Van de Kamp left McCormick Observatory to take over as director of Swarthmore College's Sproul Observatory. One of his early pupils in astrometry was Nancy Grace Roman, who went on to become NASA's first Chief of Astronomy.

His work consisted of assisting with the parallax program and continuing the proper motion work that he and Alden had begun. Van de Kamp and Alexander N. Vyssotsky spent eight years measuring 18,000 proper motions. He did additional, smaller projects individually, including an investigation for general and selective absorption of light within the Milky Way.

Barnard's Star affair

While at Sproul Observatory, he made astrometric measurements of Barnard's Star and in the 1960s reported a periodic "wobble" in its motion, apparently due to planetary companions. It was not until several decades had passed that a consensus had formed that this had been a spurious detection. In 1973 astronomers George Gatewood of the Allegheny Observatory and Heinrich Eichhorn of the University of Florida, using data obtained with improved equipment on the 30-inch Thaw Refractor telescope, did not detect any planets but instead detected a change in the color-dependent image scale of the images obtained from the 24-inch refractor telescope at the Sproul Observatory used by Van de Kamp in his study. Astronomer John L. Hershey found that this anomaly apparently occurred after each time the objective lens was removed, cleaned, and replaced. Hundreds more stars showed "wobbles" like Barnard's Star's when photographs before and after cleaning were compared – a virtual impossibility. Wulff Heintz, Van de Kamp's successor at Swarthmore and an expert on double stars, questioned his findings and began publishing criticisms from 1976 onwards; the two are reported to have become estranged because of this. Van de Kamp never admitted that his claim was in error and continued to publish papers about a planetary system around Barnard's Star into the 1980s, while modern radial velocity curves place a limit on the planets much smaller than claimed by Van de Kamp. A study in 2018 suggested that there was a planet orbiting Barnard's Star (Barnard's Star b), albeit of much lower mass than Van de Kamp could have detected; however, the existence of this planet too was questioned in 2021.

From the 1940s on Van de Kamp and his staff made similar claims of planetary systems around the nearby stars Lalande 21185, 61 Cygni, and many others, based on the same flawed photographic plates. All of these claims have been refuted. However, with the recent discoveries of numerous planetary systems, the idea that planetary systems are common—of which throughout his life Van de Kamp was a strong promoter—is being gradually proven correct.

Music
Van de Kamp was a talented musician, playing piano, viola, and violin, only forgoing a musical career in his youth because he considered this more difficult to achieve than a career in astronomy. He helped to organize an orchestra in Charlottesville, which he conducted and included fellow astronomer Alexander Vyssotsky. He also composed music for orchestra as well as for piano. From 1944 to 1954 he was conductor of the Swarthmore College Symphony Orchestra. He combined his musical gifts with another hobby, movies, by playing silent films on Swarthmore campus and accompanying them on the piano. At Swarthmore Van de Kamp performed with Peter Schickele, and made several films of Schickele's student performance, while on the occasion of his 70th birthday Schickele wrote a piano piece for him called The Easy Goin' P. v. d. K. Ever Lovin' Rag. Van de Kamp said that his fondest musical memory was playing chamber music with Albert Einstein, on the evening before the latter's commencement address at Swarthmore College in 1938.

Later life and death
In 1972 he retired from Swarthmore and returned to the Netherlands, where he became Fulbright Professor to the University of Amsterdam.  He died in suburban Amsterdam May 18, 1995, at the age of 93.

Awards and honors
In 1965 he was awarded the Rittenhouse Medal by the Rittenhouse Astronomical Society.
In 1982 he was awarded the Prix Jules Janssen by the Société Astronomique de France. In 2009 a new observatory at Swarthmore College was named for him. Asteroid 1965 van de Kamp named after astronomer Peter van de Kamp.

See also
 Lalande 21185 – Claims of planetary systems
 Sarah Lee Lippincott

References

External links
 Peter van de Kamp – Biography

1901 births
1995 deaths
Kamp, Peter
Kamp, Peter 
Kamp, Peter
Kamp, Peter
University of Virginia faculty
Swarthmore College faculty
Kamp, Peter